The 2018–19 1. FC Nürnberg season is the 119th season in the football club's history and 33rd overall season in the top flight of German football, the Bundesliga, having been promoted from the 2. Bundesliga in 2018. In addition to the domestic league, 1. FC Nürnberg also are participating in this season's edition of the domestic cup, the DFB-Pokal. This is the 69th season for Nürnberg in the Max-Morlock-Stadion, located in Nuremberg, Bavaria, Germany. The season covers a period from 1 July 2018 to 30 June 2019.

Players

Squad information

Friendly matches

Competitions

Overview

Bundesliga

League table

Results summary

Results by round

Matches

DFB-Pokal

References

1. FC Nürnberg seasons
Nurnberg